San Lucas (Spanish for "St. Luke") is an unincorporated community and census-designated place (CDP) in Monterey County, California, United States. It was founded in 1886 and named after the Rancho San Lucas, which was granted in 1842. The post office was first established in 1892.

The population was 324 at the 2020 census, up from 269 in 2010.

History
The Southern Pacific Railroad reached the place in 1886 and named it for the Rancho San Lucas Mexican land grant. The San Lucas post office opened in 1887 (having been transferred from Griswold).

Geography
U.S. Route 101 runs along the western edge of the community, leading northwest  to King City and  Salinas, the county seat, while leading southeast  to Paso Robles. California State Route 198 leads east from San Lucas across the San Andreas Rift Zone and the Diablo Range  to Coalinga.

The San Lucas AVA (American Viticultural Area) is located in the area.

Climate
This region experiences warm (but not hot) and dry summers, with no average monthly temperatures above 71.6 °F.  According to the Köppen Climate Classification system, San Lucas has a warm-summer Mediterranean climate, abbreviated "Csb" on climate maps.

Demographics

2010
The 2010 United States Census reported that San Lucas had a population of 269. The racial makeup of San Lucas was 113 (42.0%) White, 0 (0.0%) African American, 4 (1.5%) Native American, 6 (2.2%) Asian, 0 (0.0%) Pacific Islander, 127 (47.2%) from other races, and 19 (7.1%) from two or more races. Hispanic or Latino of any race were 224 persons (83.3%).

The Census reported that 269 people (100% of the population) lived in households, 0 (0%) lived in non-institutionalized group quarters, and 0 (0%) were institutionalized.

There were 67 households, out of which 38 (56.7%) had children under the age of 18 living in them, 46 (68.7%) were opposite-sex married couples living together, 8 (11.9%) had a female householder with no husband present, 3 (4.5%) had a male householder with no wife present.  There were 4 (6.0%) unmarried opposite-sex partnerships, and 0 (0%) same-sex married couples or partnerships. 7 households (10.4%) were made up of individuals, and 2 (3.0%) had someone living alone who was 65 years of age or older. The average household size was 4.01.  There were 57 families (85.1% of all households); the average family size was 4.23.

The population was spread out, with 87 people (32.3%) under the age of 18, 38 people (14.1%) aged 18 to 24, 74 people (27.5%) aged 25 to 44, 58 people (21.6%) aged 45 to 64, and 12 people (4.5%) who were 65 years of age or older.  The median age was 26.3 years. For every 100 females, there were 110.2 males.  For every 100 females age 18 and over, there were 111.6 males.

The homeowner vacancy rate was 0%; the rental vacancy rate was 11.4%.  132 people (49.1% of the population) lived in owner-occupied housing units and 137 people (50.9%) lived in rental housing units.

2000
As of the census of 2000, there were 419 people, 90 households, and 81 families residing in the CDP. The racial makeup of the CDP was 38.66% White, 0.24% Black, 1.19% Native American, 1.67% Asian, 55.37% from other races, and 2.86% from two or more races. Hispanic or Latino of any race were 86.16% of the population.

There were 90 households, out of which 63.3% had children under the age of 18 living with them, 68.9% were married couples living together, 15.6% had a female householder with no husband present, and 8.9% were non-families. 5.6% of all households were made up of individuals, and 2.2% had someone living alone who was 65 years of age or older.  The average household size was 4.66 and the average family size was 4.71.

In the CDP the population was spread out, with 44.2% under the age of 18, 10.0% from 18 to 24, 26.3% from 25 to 44, 12.4% from 45 to 64, and 7.2% who were 65 years of age or older.  The median age was 22 years. For every 100 females, there were 118.2 males.  For every 100 females age 18 and over, there were 116.7 males.

The median income for a household in the CDP was $31,538, and the median income for a family was $30,536. Males had a median income of $27,000 versus $24,375 for females. The per capita income for the CDP was $7,834.  About 23.3% of families and 29.7% of the population were below the poverty line, including 38.2% of those under age 18 and 11.4% of those age 65 or over.

Government
San Lucas is served by the San Lucas Water District.

See also

 List of census-designated places in California

References

External links

Census-designated places in Monterey County, California
Salinas Valley
Salinas River (California)
Census-designated places in California